Eurasian Bank JSC is the ninth largest lender in Kazakhstan, headquartered in Almaty. It was founded in 1994 as a closed joint-stock company, and reregistered in 2003 as a joint stock company due to joint stock company law changes.
The Bank is owned 100% by Eurasian Financial Company JSCwhich is 100% owned by three equal shareholders: Alexander Mashkevich, Alijan Ibragimov, Patokh Shodiyev (aka Patokh Chodiev)

Management
On September 13, 2022, Lyazzat Satiyeva was elected as the chairman of Management Board of Eurasian Bank JSC (Kazakhstan). On 5 December 2016, Michael Eggleton stepped down as a chief executive officer of Eurasian Bank JSC (Kazakhstan). He took up this position at the end of 2009 and, together with his experienced management team, has transformed the bank from a small troubled bank into a strong mid-tier bank with a leading consumer lending position.  Prior to joining Eurasian Bank, Michael Eggleton was a board member of Eurasian Natural Resources Corporation from the date of its flotation on the London Stock Exchange, and he was also CEO of National Bank Trust in Russia.  Prior to this he was a Managing Director at Merrill Lynch and Credit Suisse, working with companies in the CIS, Eastern Europe, Turkey and North Africa.  He started his career as a CPA, and has an MBA from San Diego State University in California. In 2013, he received the 2013 Executive of the Year Award from the American Chamber of Commerce in Kazakhstan.

Ratings 
On April 30, 2020, the international rating agency Moody's Investors Service (Moody's) retained the rating of Eurasian Bank at B2 and the basic credit rating of b3, the outlook for the bank's long-term operations in national and foreign currencies was lowered to "negative" following the worsening of general forecasts for the banking sector and economy of Kazakhstan.

On October 17, 2019, the management of Eurasian Bank JSC decided to continue cooperation only with the rating agency Moody’s Investors Service.

Eurasian Bank has a B+ Long-term Counterparty Credit Rating with Positive outlook and a kzBBB+ local scale rating from Standard & Poor's, it has had these ratings since the December 2011 upgrade. 

The bank also has a B1 Long-term foreign currency deposit rating with Negative outlook from Moody's Investors Service, it has had this rating since 2003, and the negative outlook has been in place since 2009.

History
History section based on press releases and chronology found on company website.

1990s 
	December 1994 – Eurasian Bank was registered as Joint Stock Bank by National Bank of Kazakhstan
 	February 1995 – Bank received General License to fulfill bank operations
	 March 1996 – Receipt of License for broker and dealer activity
 	April 1996 – Becomes prime dealer on Government securities
 	May 1996 – Bank became the member of Kazakhstan Stock Exchange
 	September 1997 – Receipt of the License for broker activity with Government securities
 	September 1997 – Bank became member of SWIFT
 	April 1998 – Receipt of License for custodian activity

2000s 
 	February 2000 – Bank became member of the Deposit Guarantee System 
 	November 2000 – Became a member of VISA International
 	January 2002 – Receipt of the license to fulfill bank operations in tenge and foreign currencies
 	July 2003 – Moody’s rating agency assigned Bank a B1 rating for long term and NP rating for short term deposits in foreign currency, E for Financial Strength Rating. Outlook Stable 
 	October 2004 – Became a member of Kazakhstan Fund for mortgage loans guarantee
 	July 2006 – Fitch rating agency assigned the Bank with B- Issuer’s Default Rating, and B short-term rating. Outlook Stable
 	November 2006 – Standard & Poor’s assigned Bank В/В long and short term ratings, kzBB national scale rating, Outlook Stable
	July 2007 – Standard & Poor's changed its Outlook to Positive from Stable. Credit ratings B/B were confirmed. Bank’s local national scale rating was upgraded to kzBВB- from kzBВ
	September 2008 – Visa International raises the status of the Bank to Principal Member
	December 2008 – Eurasian Bank and Visa presented world's first exclusive card with diamond and gold ornaments – VISA Infinite Eurasian Diamond Card.
 	October 2009 – Appointment of the new chairman of the management board (CEO) – Mr. Michael Eggleton

2010s 
 	April 2010 – Completion of the acquisition of 99.99% of the shares of Bank Troika Dialog in Moscow
 	June 2010 – Moody's Investors Service assigned a rating of B1 for debt in local currency
 	February 2011 – Acquisition of Micro Credit Organization ProstoCredit from Société Générale
 	December 2011 – Standard & Poor's raises the credit rating of the Bank to B/B, the local rating from kzBB to kzBB+, and changes the outlook from negative to stable
 	December 2011 – The Bank ends the year with more than 450 points of sale throughout Kazakhstan.  Client numbers increased by 250,000 to 419,000
 	July 2012 – Euromoney magazine named Eurasian Bank as Best Bank in Kazakhstan
 	July 2012 – Kazakhstani Rating Agency KzRating upgraded the credit rating of the Bank on a national scale from BBB to A- and the international scale from BB- to BB with a Stable outlook
 	December 2012 – The Bank ends the year with 1,900 points of sale and 648,000 clients
 	January 2013 – Eurasian Bank opens its Private Banking branch for VIP clients, offering wealth management services from international partners
 	January 2013 – Eurasian Bank becomes principal member of MasterCard
 	February 2013 – Eurasian Bank launches its Branch of the Future plan with automated electronic cashiers in to branches in Almaty and Atyrau
 	May 2013 – Michael Eggleton, the CEO, received the CEO of the Year – 2013 award from the American Chamber of Commerce in Kazakhstan
 	July 2013 – Standard & Poor's Maintains the credit rating of the Bank at B+/B+, raises the local rating from kzBBB to kzBBB+, and changes the outlook from stable to positive
 	December 2013 – Eurasian Bank completes first retail loan assignment & servicing transaction in Kazakhstan market. Essentially a synthetic securitization.
 	February 2014 – Moody's rating agency reaffirms Eurasian Bank's B1 rating
 	June 2014 – Eurasian Bank launches mobile banking for retail customersOn October 21, 2015, a deal was concluded to acquire 100% of the shares of BankPozitiv Kazakhstan JSC.
   December 2016 – June 2019 – Pavel Loginov was appointed Chairman of the Board of the Bank.

2020s 
   December 2020 – the transaction for the sale of 100% of the shares of JSC SB Eurasian Bank (Russia) was completed, the buyer was Sovcombank PJSC.

Criticism
On January 16, 2015, Tatyana Burnakina, Executive Director of the Department of Bank Cards and Payment Services, allowed herself to criticize the professional activities of her bank employees, giving an interview to the Krasnoyarsk edition Newslab.ru. Among other things, Burnakina stated about the facts of fraud and theft in the bank. On January 19, 2015, the press service of the bank disseminated information in the media about the termination of the employment contract with Tatyana Burnakina for gross violations of the code of ethics and business conduct

References

External links

 Kazakhstan Stock Exchange Member page
 FNMC - Financial regulator website list of second tier banks
 - National Bank website Statistics on Financial sector

Banks of Kazakhstan
Eurasian Natural Resources Corporation
1994 establishments in Kazakhstan
Banks established in 1994
Kazakhstani brands